Europa (AK-81) was never commissioned and thus never bore the USS designation.

The ship was laid down 2 March 1942 as MV William Lester, a Maritime Commission type (N3-M-A1) hull, under Maritime Commission contract (MC hull 464), at the Penn-Jersey Shipbuilding Company of Camden, New Jersey and launched 7 December 1942. She was delivered to the Navy uncompleted 24 November 1943; transferred the next day, 25 November 1943, to the United States Army; stricken from Navy lists 6 December 1943.

The ship, renamed Thomas F. Farrell Jr., after an engineering officer killed 25 February 1944 at Anzio, began conversion in December, 1943 to an Engineer Port Repair ship manned by a military crew under the U.S. Army Corps of Engineers. The ship did not complete conversion until 30 April 1944 and did not sail for Europe until late summer. The ship was one of the port repair ships making it to Europe in time to assist in the restoration of ports.

Thomas F. Farrell Jr. was laid up in the reserve fleet at Suisun Bay on 12 June 1947 and sold to Zidell Explorations, Inc. by Maritime Administration sale 14 April 1965 for non-transportation use. The ship was scrapped in 1967.

Notes

References

External links 
 NavSource Online: Service Ship Photo Archive - AK-81 Europa/USAT Thomas F. Farrell, Jr.
 Thomas F. Farrell, Jr. 1942 (West Point Association of Graduates page)
 Thomas Francis Farrell , Jr.

 

Port repair ships of the United States Army
Enceladus-class cargo ships
Ships built in Camden, New Jersey
1942 ships
Type N3 ships of the United States Army
World War II auxiliary ships of the United States